Neuenkirchen is a municipality in the district of Osnabrück, in Lower Saxony, Germany. It is situated approximately 20 km northwest of Osnabrück.

Neuenkirchen is also the seat of the Samtgemeinde ("collective municipality") Neuenkirchen.

Mayor
Since 2016, the veterinarian Vitus Buntenkötter is the new mayor. He is the successor of Christoph Lührmann (CDU), who was in office 2011–2016.

References

Osnabrück (district)